Isak Carl Axel Yong Kun Bråholm (born 24 September 2000) is a Swedish football midfielder who plays for Sandviken.

Club career
On 23 February 2022, Bråholm returned to Sandviken on a permanent basis after playing for the club in 2021 on loan.

References

2000 births
Living people
Swedish footballers
Association football midfielders
IK Sirius Fotboll players
IFK Luleå players
Sandvikens IF players
Allsvenskan players
Ettan Fotboll players